Fallodon railway station was a private railway station built for Earl Grey at Fallodon Hall, Northumberland, England from 1847 to 1934 on the East Coast Main Line.

History 
The station opened on 1 July 1847 by the York, Newcastle and Berwick Railway as a private station. The station was situated on the north side of the level crossing on the lane branching off the B1340 a short distance northeast of Christon Bank village. The station closed completely on 30 May 1934. The station was demolished in the mid 60s. Although the platforms and buildings were removed, the forecourt of the old station building still remains with a short section of the wall.

References

External links 

Disused railway stations in Northumberland
Former North Eastern Railway (UK) stations
Railway stations in Great Britain opened in 1847
Railway stations in Great Britain closed in 1934
1847 establishments in England
1934 disestablishments in England
Former private railway stations